Direct, produce and film Emmy Award winning Film Series.
The Crusty Demons are a group of daredevil freestyle motorcyclists from the United States, Australia, New Zealand, and Europe. They originated in 1994 with the filming of Crusty Demons of Dirt by Fleshwound Films. Since then, they have won an Emmy for Best Action Sports Documentary, produced and released over 20 films, in 2007, the video game Crusty Demons was released to the public, and spent over a decade touring and manging the Crusty Demons Tour. Together the members of Crusty Demons have set 11 world records in their careers.

Background 
The origins of the group can be traced to 1994, when filmmakers Jon Freeman and Dana Nicholson had been accumulating footage to showcase a behind the scenes expose of the lifestyle of an American pro motocross rider in action, featuring 145 ft plus jumps, 45 ft high in the air soaring over sand dunes, mountains, houses, buses and anything else secure and steep enough to hold the weight of bike and rider. The end result was Fleshwound Films and the first video "Crusty Demons of Dirt".

Following the success of the first film, Crusty 2 premiered 18 months later. Sales exceeded expectations and tripled from the first video as the Crusty phenomenon began spreading worldwide. What was somewhat a stagnant sport had received a positive injection of interest and proved its worthiness of being showcased Internationally. People began buying the clothing worn by their heroes (Fleshgear) and thousands around the world were getting bikes and heading for the racetrack, mountains, sand dunes and the sky. With a unique production style the Crusty Demons filmed created a whole new genre of Action Sports Films. With cutting-edge editing by Director of Photography Scotty Avalos, they quickly gained a following and the hardcore fans were born.

With the release of Crusty 3 in 1997 and the videos and sport rising in popularity, freestyle motocross pioneer Lofty (a.k.a. Brian Jordan) went to Fleshwound Films with the idea of staging a freestyle motocross competition. Four months later the first competition was held in Las Vegas. This new side of the sport was looked down upon by the industry and many people said it would go nowhere, but the excitement amongst the fans indicated otherwise.

Fleshwound Films undoubtedly played a crucial part in the evolution of the sport, they are still shooting Crusty Films today and recently released the 10th installment titled "Crusty X – A Decade of Dirt". Apart from videos, Fleshwound also made a great success out of Fleshwound Film merchandise, which inspired their creation of the official Crusty clothing brand, Flesh gear (a freestyle ride gear and lifestyle clothing).

Riders

Joey Flora
Justin "Buster" Karogla
Dana Nicholson
Scotty Avalos
Dan Pastor
Brian Deegan
Jackson Strong
Jordan lewis
Mike Metzger
Jeff Emig
Tommy "Tomcat" Clowers
Ryan Hughes
Larry "Link" Linkogle
Brian Manley
Jeremy McGrath
Nate Adams (Destroyer)
Jeremy Stenberg (Twitch)
"Mad" Mike Jones
Adam Jones
Mike Mason
Jim McNeil
Seth Enslow
Trigger Gumm
Jon Guetter (Big G)
Derek Guetter (Little G)
Garry-Owen McKinnon (MACKA)
Jimmy Blaze (Blaze)
Justin Hoyer
Matt Schubring (Schuie)
Robbie Maddison (Maddo)
Brad O'Neal
Steve Mini
Jackson Strong (Jacko)
Joel Balchin
Luke Smith (Smithy)
Cam Sinclair (Sincs)
James Chiasson (Bubba)
Clifford Adopdante 
Tony Hill (TMan)
Levi (Leverage)
Erik Harlowe
Mary Perkins
Michael Norris (Chuck)
Marcus Lewis (Mad Dewg Marcus)
Trevor Porter (Legend) (World Number 2)
Daniel  Grant (Champion) (World Number 3)
Alex tubbah Noonan
Scott Murray
Victor chhin
Liam buttigieg

Kirstty Slama 
Travis Pastrana
Ronnie Faisst
Les Engle
Carey Hart
T. Mort 
European riders:
Mike Broeker
León Carlos Toledano Macías
Maikel Melero
Gabriel "Gabi" Villada
Kristian Linné
Kai Haase
Victor Marcusson
Vanni Oddera
Darek Klopot
Vivian Gantner
Cassandra Lundin 'Cassie / Stuntergirl'

Prominent riders 

Nate Adams is currently ranked the number one freestyle motocross athlete in the world and Trigger Gumm held the world record for the longest jump on a motorcycle, until it was broken by Australian Robbie Maddison on December 31, 2007. Gumm was a four-time Guinness Book World Record holder for longest distance jump, breaking the record in Australia in May 2005 when he launched his Service Honda 500 cc motorcycle 277.5 feet. He also has the record for height in jumping, going vertical at 80 feet high. Seth Enslow who is also a member of the Crusty Demons set the record for the longest jump on a Harley-Davidson in March 2010 in Australia. Also Jeff Emig was a major rider in the Crusty Demons of Dirt, winning four world champion titles.

DVD list

 	Crusty Demons of Dirt (1995)
 	Crusty Demons of Dirt 2: Twisted Metal (1996)
 	Crusty Demons of Dirt 3: Aerial Assault (1997)
 	Crusty Demons of Dirt 4: God Bless the Freaks (1998)
 	Crusty Demons of Dirt 5: The Metal Millennium (1999)
 	Crusty Demons of Dirt 6: The Next Level (2000)
 	Crusty Demons of Dirt 7: The 7th Mission (2001)
 	Crusty Demons of Dirt 8: The Eighth Dimension (2002)
 	Crusty Demons of Dirt 9: Nine Lives (2003)
 	Crusty Demons of Dirt 10: A Decade of Dirt (2004)
 	Crusty Demons of Dirt 11: Chaotic Chronicle (2005)
 	Crusty Demons of Dirt 12: The Dirty Dozen (2006)
 	Crusty Demons of Dirt 13: Unleash Hell (2007)
 	Crusty Demons of Dirt 14: A Bloodthirsty Saga (2008)
 	Crusty Demons of Dirt 15: Blood Sweat & Fears (2010)
 	Crusty Demons of Dirt 16: Outback Attack (2012)
 	Crusty Demons of Dirt 17: World of Insanity (2013)
 	Crusty Demons of Dirt 18: Twenty Years of Fears (2015)
 	Crusty Demons of Dirt: Josh Anderson Dirt to Dust (2003)(TV Series)
 	Crusty Demons of Dirt: Global Assault Tour (2004)
 	Crusty Demons of Dirt: Night of World Records (2007)
 	Crusty Demons of Dirt: Night of World Records II (2008)

Video game

Records
The Crusty Demons have set the following world records:
Longest Wheelie on a BMX - 255 feet, set by Trevor Porter
Longest jump on a 250 cc motorcycle - 255.4 feet, set by Larry Linkogle
Longest jump on a 125 cc motorcycle - 221 feet, set by Robbie Maddison
Longest jump with a trick on a 250 cc motorcycle - 246 feet, set by Robbie Maddison
Longest jump on a quad bike - 176 feet 11 inches by Jon Guetter
Longest jump on a pro mini bike - 104 feet 7 inches by Brent Brady
First ever backflip on a PW 50 - Daniel Grant
Heaviest weight lifted while swallowing a sword - 22.4 kg by Chayne Hultgren
Most swords swallowed at once - 17 by Chayne Hultgren, known as the Space Cowboy
Longest ramp to ramp backflip - 129 feet 7 inches by Cam Sinclair
Longest jump on a motorcycle - 351 feet by Robbie Maddison

References

External links
Official Website
Crusty Demons Europe
Official Game Website
Flesh Wound Films Website

Freestyle motocross
Motorcycle stunt performers
Sports entertainment
Freestyle motocross riders